The women's field hockey tournament at the 2003 Pan American Games was the 5th edition of the field hockey event for women at the Pan American Games. It was held over a ten-day period beginning on 3 August, and culminating with the medal finals on 13 August. All games were played at the Santo Domingo Stadium in Santo Domingo, Dominican Republic.

Argentina won the gold medal for a record fifth time after defeating the United States 3–1 in the final. Uruguay won the bronze medal by defeating Chile 5–4 in penalties after the match finished a 2–2 draw.

The tournament served as the Pan American qualifier for the 2004 Summer Olympics in Athens, Greece.

Qualification
Alongside the host nation, who received an automatic berth, eight teams participated in the tournament.

Officials
The following umpires were appointed by the PAHF and FIH to officiate the tournament.

Mercedes Sánchez (ARG)
Emma Simmons (BER)
Keely Dunn (CAN)
Ann van Dyk (CAN)
Claudia Videla (CHL)
Alison Hill (ENG)
Alicia Takeda (MEX)
Sarah Garnett (NZL)
Susan Gomes (TTO)
Jun Kentwell (USA)
Rosario Ardanaz (URU)

Results

Preliminary round

Pool A

Pool B

Classification round

Fifth to eighth place classification

Crossover

Seventh and eighth place

Fifth and sixth place

First to fourth place classification

Semi-finals

Third and fourth place

Final

Statistics

Final standings

Goalscorers

References

External links
 Official Site

Women's tournament
Pan American Games
Women's events at the 2003 Pan American Games
Pan American Games
2003